A nuclear chain fiber is a specialized sensory organ contained within a muscle.  Nuclear chain fibers are intrafusal fibers that, along with nuclear bag fibers, make up the muscle spindle responsible for the detection of changes in muscle length.

There are 3–9 nuclear chain fibers per muscle spindle that are half the size of the nuclear bag fibers. Their nuclei are aligned in a chain and they excite the secondary nerve. They are static, whereas the nuclear bag fibers are dynamic in comparison.  The name "nuclear chain" refers to the structure of the central region of the fiber, where the sensory axons wrap around the intrafusal fibers.

The secondary nerve association involves an efferent and afferent pathway that measure the stress and strain placed on the muscle (usually the extrafusal fibers connected from the muscle portion to a bone).  The afferent pathway resembles a spring wrapping around the nuclear chain fiber and connecting to one of its ends away from the bone.  Again, depending on the stress and strain the muscles sustains, this afferent and efferent coordination will measure the "stretch of the spring" and communicate the results to the central nervous system.

A similar structure attaching one end to muscle and the other end to a tendon is known as a Golgi tendon organ.  However, Golgi tendon organs differ from nuclear chain and nuclear bag fibers in that they are considered in series rather than in parallel to the muscle fibers.

Innervation
As intrafusal muscle fibers, nuclear chain fibers are innervated by both sensory afferents and motor efferents.  The afferent innervation is via type Ia sensory fibers and type II sensory fibers. These project to the nucleus proprius in the dorsal horn of the spinal cord.  Efferent innervation is via static γ motor neurons.  Stimulation of γ neurons causes the nuclear chain to shorten along with the extrafusal muscle fibers.  This shortening allows the nuclear chain fiber to be sensitive to changes in  length while its corresponding muscle is contracted.

References

External links
 Unmc.edu 

Nervous system
Muscular system